The 1990 Junior Pan American Artistic Gymnastics Championships was held in Tallahassee, United States, June 16–23, 1990.

Medal summary

Junior division

The United States men's team was disqualified after age-eligibility issues and gymnasts Mark Booth, Rick Kieffer, Rob Kieffer were deemed not eligible for medals. Only Casey Bryan was allowed to stay in the competition and advance to the event finals.

Children's division

Casey Bryan from the United States originally competed at the Children's division and placed second in the individual all-around, but he was subsequently moved to the Junior division and his scores were not considered for the team and individual all-around competitions at the Children's division. The reallocation caused him to place 10th all-around in the Junior division.

References

1990 in gymnastics
Pan American Gymnastics Championships
International gymnastics competitions hosted by the United States
1990 in American sports